The 1963 Motocross World Championship was the 7th edition of the Motocross World Championship organized by the FIM and reserved for 500cc and 250cc motorcycles.

Summary
Rolf Tibblin claimed his second consecutive 500cc motocross world championship with his countryman, Sten Lundin taking second place. Tibblin took five Grand Prix victories riding for the Husqvarna factory racing team. 

A significant moment in motocross history occurred when ČZ factory rider Vlastimil Valek rode a 263cc two-stroke motorcycle to win the first moto of the 500cc Czechoslovakian Grand Prix. The victory marked a turning point in motocross history as, it was the first win by a two-stroke powered motorcycle in the premier division of the Motocross World Championships.

Tibblin's Husqvarna teammate Torsten Hallman also claimed his second consecutive 250cc motocross world championship in dominating fashion by winning 8 of the 14 Grand Prix races. Vlastimil Valek took second place riding for the ČZ factory.

Grands Prix

500cc

250cc

Final standings

Points are awarded to the top 6 classified finishers.

500cc

250cc

Notes

References

Motocross World Championship seasons
Motocross World Championship